
Gmina Malechowo is a rural gmina (administrative district) in Sławno County, West Pomeranian Voivodeship, in north-western Poland.

Villages
Gmina Malechowo contains the villages and settlements of Baniewo, Bartolino, Białęciniec, Białęcino, Borkowo, Darskowo, Drzeńsko, Gorzyca, Grabowo, Karw, Karwice, Karwiczki, Kawno, Kosierzewo, Krzekoszewo, Kukułczyn, Kusice, Kusiczki, Laski, Lejkówko, Lejkowo, Malechówko, Malechowo, Miłomyśl, Mułek, Niemica, Nowy Żytnik, Ostrowiec, Paprotki, Paproty, Pękanino, Pięćmiechowo, Podgórki, Przystawy, Sęczkowo, Sulechówko, Sulechowo, Święcianowo, Uniedrożyn, Uniesław, Witosław, Włodzisław, Zalesie, Żegocino and Zielenica.

Neighbouring gminas
Gmina Malechowo is bordered by the gminas of Darłowo, Polanów, Sianów and Sławno.

References
Polish official population figures 2006

Malechowo
Sławno County

de:Malechowo#Gmina Malechowo